The Mass on the World is a live album by jazz trumpeter Wadada Leo Smith released in 1978 by German Moers Music label. The album was recorded at the seventh Moers Festival in Freizeitpark, Moers, Germany, on May 15, 1978. The songs and album title are borrowed from Teilhard de Chardin’s Hymn of the Universe, a poetic and impressionistic account of the spiritual world initially published in 1961.

Track listing

Personnel
Leo Smith – trumpet, fluegelhorn, flute, percussion
Dwight Andrews – reeds
Bobby Naughton – vibraphone, percussion

References

Wadada Leo Smith live albums
1978 live albums